The 1985 Fuji 1000 Kilometres was the ninth round of the 1985 World Endurance Championship as well as the fifth round of the 1985 All Japan Endurance Championship.  It took place at the Fuji Speedway, Japan on October 6, 1985.

Rain
Prior to the start of the race, heavy rain fell on the Fuji circuit.  Several racing teams were concerned with the safety of the circuit under such conditions, even leading to the Italiya Lancia withdrawing just prior to the warm-up laps.  Although the race started, the first ten laps were held under caution in order for the drivers to adapt to the wet circuit.  Three teams chose to immediately withdraw before the first lap was even completed, including the two Rothmans Porsches.  Within the next several laps, both Tom Walkinshaw Jaguars also returned to the pits to withdraw.  The first Japanese squad to withdraw after the race began was the Alpha Cubic Porsche, stopping after only six laps, and followed two laps later by both Mazdas.  By time caution was withdrawn at the beginning of the eleventh lap, fifteen cars had already returned to the pits to withdraw.  They were joined a lap later by the Bartlett Chevron, the last remaining European entry.

Eighteen cars remained in the event, all Japanese squads.  The torrential rain continued however, and after two hours of racing, the organisers chose to end the event after completing only a fourth of the scheduled distance.  As the race was shortened, half points were awarded in the Teams Championship, as well as the Drivers Championship, but only to those drivers who had actually had a chance to drive during the race.

Official results
Class winners in bold.  Cars failing to complete 75% of the winner's distance marked as Not Classified (NC).

Statistics
 Pole Position - #2 Rothmans Porsche - 1:15.92
 Average Speed - 135.379 km/h

References

 

Fuji
Fuji
6 Hours of Fuji